is a Japanese retired professional wrestler and judoka, Sakaguchi holds a 7th dan red and white belt in Judo. Sakaguchi was a mainstay of New Japan Pro-Wrestling (NJPW) and also competed for the World Wide Wrestling Federation and the National Wrestling Alliance. His sons are professional wrestler and mixed martial arts fighter Yukio Sakaguchi and television actor Kenji Sakaguchi. Sakaguchi currently works for New Japan as an advisor.

Judo career 
Before becoming a professional wrestler, Sakaguchi was a judoka with a fifth degree black belt and won the 1965 All Japan Judo Championship. Coach Koji Sone was accused by  Anton Geesink's teammates in the 1965 World Judo Championships of having Sakaguchi throw the match against the more rested Matsunaga in order to allow Matsunaga take on the weary Geesink in the final round.

Professional wrestling career 
Sakaguchi debuted in August 1967 for the Japan Wrestling Association. When JWA closed down in 1973, he joined New Japan Pro-Wrestling. He retired from the ring in March 1990. He was the president of the National Wrestling Alliance from 1992 to 1993.

At age 61, Seiji Sakaguchi came out of retirement to team up with Masahiro Chono against Yoshihiro Takayama and Shinya Makabe on September 14, 2003.

Acting career 
Sakaguchi appeared in the 1982 American film Forced Vengeance.  His role was a minor one, though he did appear in the film's climactic fight scene, battling star Chuck Norris.

Championships and accomplishments 
Cauliflower Alley Club
Other honoree (1996)

European Wrestling Union
EWU World Super Heavyweight Championship (1 time)

Japan Wrestling Association
All Asia Tag Team Championship (1 time) - with Michiaki Yoshimura
NWA International Tag Team Championship (2 time) - with Giant Baba (1 time) and Kintaro Ohki (1 time)
NWA United National Championship (1 time)

New Japan Pro-Wrestling
Asia Tag Team Championship (1 time) - with Strong Kobayashi
NWA North American Tag Team Championship (Los Angeles/Japan version) (3 times) - with Antonio Inoki (1 time) and Strong Kobayashi (2 times)
NWF North American Heavyweight Championship (1 time)
WWF North American Heavyweight Championship (1 time, final)
World League (1976-1977)
Greatest 18 Club inductee
Greatest Wrestlers (Class of 2007)

NWA Hollywood Wrestling
NWA North American Tag Team Championship (Los Angeles/Japan version) (2 times) - with Antonio Inoki (1 time) and Riki Choshu (1 time)
NWA United National Championship (1 time)
World Tag League (1971) - with Antonio Inoki
World Tag League (1972) - with Akihisa Takachiho

NWA Polynesian Wrestling
NWA Polynesian Pacific Tag Team Championship (1 time) - with Lars Anderson

Pro Wrestling Illustrated
PWI ranked him # 146 of the 500 best singles wrestlers of the PWI Years in 2003

Tokyo Sports
Best Tag Team Award (1975) with Antonio Inoki
Best Tag Team Award (1976) with Strong Kobayashi
Fighting Spirit Award (1977)
Lifetime Achievement Award (1990, 2012)
Outstanding Performance Award (1976)
Special Award (2003)

References

External links 
 Seiji Sakaguchi at Puroresu.com
 

1942 births
20th-century professional wrestlers
Living people
Japanese male actors
Japanese male judoka
Japanese male professional wrestlers
Japanese practitioners of Brazilian jiu-jitsu
Judoka trainers
People from Kurume
Professional wrestling executives
Professional wrestling trainers
Stampede Wrestling alumni
All Asia Tag Team Champions
NWF North American Heavyweight Champions
NWA North American Tag Team Champions (Los Angeles/Japan version)
NWA United National Champions
NWA International Tag Team Champions